Leon Walter Tillage (January 19, 1936 – October 5, 2011) was an African American whose autobiographical children's book Leon's Story (1997) features the effects of Jim Crow laws on the lives of African Americans during the 1930s and 1940s – and of the later Civil Rights Movement.

Tillage was a sharecropper's son in small-town North Carolina during the "Jim Crow" era of racial segregation. He worked as a custodian at Park School of Baltimore for more than 30 years beginning in 1967. Tillage's father got run over by a car and died because of some drunk teenagers which made his family fall into debt and his mother had to run the household on her own. Leon's Story is an oral history based on interviews of Tillage by Susan L. Roth, published by Farrar, Straus and Giroux in 1997; it won the Carter G. Woodson Book Award in 1998.

Traduction:

Leon Walter Tillage (19 janvier 1936 - 5 octobre 2011) était un Afro-Américain dont le livre autobiographique pour enfants Leon's Story (1997) présente les effets des lois Jim Crow sur la vie des Afro-Américains au cours des années 1930 et 1940 - et du dernier Mouvement des droits civiques.[1] Le travail du sol était le fils d'un métayer dans une petite ville de Caroline du Nord à l'époque de la ségrégation raciale « Jim Crow ».[1] Il a travaillé comme gardien à la Park School of Baltimore pendant plus de 30 ans à partir de 1967.[2] Le père de Léon s'est fait renverser par une voiture et est décédé à cause d'adolescents ivres, ce qui a obligé sa famille à s'endetter et sa mère a dû s'occuper seule de la maison. L'histoire de Léon est une histoire orale basée sur des interviews de Tillage par Susan L. Roth, publiée par Farrar, Straus et Giroux en 1997; il a remporté le Carter G. Woodson Book Award en 1998.[1][3]

References

External links
 

1937 births
2011 deaths
American male writers
Carter G. Woodson Book Award winners